The Commoners' Party () is a political party in Thailand founded on 2 March 2018 by Kittichai Ngamchaipisit, a university dropout and electrician, and Por Gun Tee, a former Oun YT (Youth Training Center) leader. According to Tee, the main goal of the party is to elect poor people to parliament. Instead of trying to represent the poor people and their voices, the party aims to let them speak for themselves, which is why it is called the Commoners' Party. The party's symbol is an equal sign (=).

The commoner movement was founded by activists in 2012 to protest the government's not caring enough about the poor people of Thailand.

The ideology of the Commoners' Party is liberal democracy. It opposes the government of Prime Minister Prayut Chan-o-cha. Apart from including poor people and the underprivileged in parliament, the party also agitates for LGBT rights, women's rights, educational reform in the deep south, rights to local natural resources, better universal healthcare, labor rights for both Thai and migrant workers, decentralization and local self-determination.

References

External links 
 

Political parties in Thailand
Left-wing parties in Thailand
Political parties established in 2018